Jared Mason Diamond (born September 10, 1937) is an American geographer, historian, ornithologist, and author best known for his popular science books The Third Chimpanzee (1991); Guns, Germs, and Steel (1997, awarded a Pulitzer Prize); Collapse (2005), The World Until Yesterday (2012), and Upheaval (2019). Originally trained in biochemistry and physiology, Diamond is known for drawing from a variety of fields, including anthropology, ecology, geography, and evolutionary biology. He is a professor of geography at UCLA.

In 2005, Diamond was ranked ninth on a poll by Prospect and Foreign Policy of the world's top 100 public intellectuals.

Early life and education 
Diamond was born on September 10, 1937, in Boston, Massachusetts, United States. Both of his parents were from Ashkenazi Jewish families who had emigrated to the United States. His father, Louis Diamond, was a physician who emigrated from Chișinău, (present-day Moldova, then known as Bessarabia), and his mother, Flora (Kaplan), a teacher, linguist, and concert pianist. Diamond began studying piano at age six. Years later, he would propose to his wife after playing the Brahms Intermezzo in A major for her.

Already at the age of seven he developed an interest in bird-watching. This became one of his major life-passions and resulted in a number of works published in ornithology.

At the age of 15 for the first time his parents took him outside of the eastern U.S., to Montana, where they spent holidays at the Hirschy's family ranch on Big Hole River. In summer 1956, as a college student, he returned to the ranch to work. Later, impressed by the beauty of the state, he regularly spent his own family holidays there, and Montana and the Bitterroot Valley became one of the key examples in his book Collapse: How Societies Choose to Fail or Succeed
.

He attended the Roxbury Latin School and earned a Bachelor of Arts in Biochemical Sciences from Harvard College in 1958 and a PhD on the physiology and biophysics of membranes in the gall bladder from Trinity College, Cambridge in 1961.

Career

After graduation from Cambridge, Diamond returned to Harvard as a Junior Fellow until 1965, and, in 1968, became a professor of physiology at UCLA Medical School. While in his twenties he developed a second, parallel, career in ornithology and ecology, specialising in New Guinea and nearby islands, which he began visiting from 1964. Later, in his fifties, Diamond developed a third career in environmental history and became a professor of geography at UCLA, his  position. He also teaches at LUISS Guido Carli in Rome. He won the National Medal of Science in 1999 and Westfield State University granted him an honorary doctorate in 2009.

Diamond originally specialized in salt absorption in the gall bladder. He has also published scholarly works in the fields of ecology and ornithology, but is arguably best known for authoring a number of popular-science books combining topics from diverse fields other than those he has formally studied. Because of this academic diversity, Diamond has been described as a polymath.

Popular science works

The Third Chimpanzee (1991) 
Diamond's first popular book, The Third Chimpanzee: The Evolution and Future of the Human Animal (1991), examines human evolution and its relevance to the modern world, incorporating evidence from anthropology, evolutionary biology, genetics, ecology, and linguistics. The book traces how humans evolved to be so different from other animals, despite sharing over 98% of our DNA with our closest animal relatives, the chimpanzees. The book also examines the animal origins of language, art, agriculture, smoking and drug use, and other apparently uniquely human attributes. It was well received by critics and won the 1992 Rhône-Poulenc Prize for Science Books and the Los Angeles Times Book Prize.

Guns, Germs, and Steel (1997) 
His second and best known popular science book, Guns, Germs, and Steel: The Fates of Human Societies, was published in 1997. It asks why Eurasian peoples conquered or displaced Native Americans, Australians, and Africans, instead of vice versa. It argues that this outcome was not due to genetic advantages of Eurasian peoples themselves but instead to features of the Eurasian continent, in particular, its high diversity of wild plant and animal species suitable for domestication and its east/west major axis that favored the spread of those domesticates, people, technologies—and diseases—for long distances with little change in latitude.

The first part of the book focuses on reasons why only a few species of wild plants and animals proved suitable for domestication. The second part discusses how local food production based on those domesticates led to the development of dense and stratified human populations, writing, centralized political organization, and epidemic infectious diseases. The third part compares the development of food production and of human societies among different continents and world regions. Guns, Germs, and Steel became an international best-seller, was translated into 33 languages, and received several awards, including a Pulitzer Prize, an Aventis Prize for Science Books and the 1997 Phi Beta Kappa Award in Science. A television documentary series based on the book was produced by the National Geographic Society in 2005.

Why is Sex Fun? (1997) 

In his third book, Why is Sex Fun?, also published in 1997, Diamond discusses evolutionary factors underlying features of human sexuality that are generally taken for granted but that are highly unusual among our animal relatives. Those features include a long-term pair relationship (marriage), coexistence of economically cooperating pairs within a shared communal territory, provision of parental care by fathers as well as by mothers, having sex in private rather than in public, concealed ovulation, female sexual receptivity encompassing most of the menstrual cycle (including days of infertility), female menopause, and distinctive secondary sexual characteristics.

Collapse (2005) 
Diamond's next book, Collapse: How Societies Choose to Fail or Succeed, published in 2005, examines a range of past societies in an attempt to identify why they either collapsed or continued to thrive and considers what contemporary societies can learn from these historical examples. As in Guns, Germs, and Steel, he argues against explanations for the failure of past societies based primarily on cultural factors, instead focusing on ecology. Among the societies mentioned in the book are the Norse and Inuit of Greenland, the Maya, the Anasazi, the indigenous people of Rapa Nui (Easter Island), Japan, Haiti, the Dominican Republic, and modern Montana.

The book concludes by asking why some societies make disastrous decisions, how big businesses affect the environment, what our principal environmental problems are today, and what individuals can do about those problems. Like Guns, Germs, and Steel, Collapse was translated into dozens of languages, became an international best-seller, and was the basis of a television documentary produced by the National Geographic Society. Collapse was also nominated for the Royal Society Prize for Science Books.

Fifteen archaeologists, cultural anthropologists, and historians from the American Anthropological Association criticized Diamond's methods and conclusions, working together with the larger association to publish the book Questioning Collapse as a counter to Diamond's claims. In response, Diamond, as an editor at the time for the journal Nature, published an official review in the journal negatively covering the book without mentioning that the book was meant to be a critique of his own works. The authors and the publisher, Cambridge University Press, called out Diamond for his conflict of interest on the subject.

"Vengeance is Ours" controversy (2008) 
In 2008, Diamond published an article in The New Yorker entitled "Vengeance Is Ours", describing the role of revenge in tribal warfare in Papua New Guinea. A year later, two indigenous people mentioned in the article filed a lawsuit against Diamond and The New Yorker, claiming the article defamed them. In 2013, The Observer reported that the lawsuit "was withdrawn by mutual consent after the sudden death of their lawyer."

Natural Experiments of History (2010) 
In 2010, Diamond co-edited (with James Robinson) Natural Experiments of History, a collection of seven case studies illustrating the multidisciplinary and comparative approach to the study of history that he advocates. The book's title stems from the fact that it is not possible to study history by the preferred methods of the laboratory sciences, i.e., by controlled experiments comparing replicated human societies as if they were test tubes of bacteria. Instead, one must look at natural experiments in which human societies that are similar in many respects have been historically perturbed. The book's afterword classifies natural experiments, discusses the practical difficulties of studying them, and offers suggestions on how to address those difficulties.

The World Until Yesterday (2012) 
In The World Until Yesterday, published in 2012, Diamond asks what the western world can learn from traditional societies. It surveys 39 traditional small-scale societies of farmers and hunter-gatherers with respect to how they deal with universal human problems. The problems discussed include dividing space, resolving disputes, bringing up children, treatment of elders, dealing with dangers, formulating religions, learning multiple languages, and remaining healthy. The book suggests that some practices of traditional societies could be usefully adopted in the modern industrial world today, either by individuals or else by society as a whole.

Upheaval (2019) 
In  Upheaval: How Nations Cope with Crisis and Change Diamond examines whether nations can find lessons during crises in a way like people do. The nations considered are Finland, Japan, Chile, Indonesia, Germany, Australia, and the U.S. Diamond identifies four modern threats: nuclear weapons, climate change, limited resources, and extreme inequality.

Anand Giridharadas, reviewing for The New York Times, claimed the book contained many factual inaccuracies. Daniel Immerwahr, reviewing for The New Republic, reports that Diamond has "jettisoned statistical analysis" and the associated rigour, even by the standards of his earlier books, which have themselves sometimes been challenged on this basis.

Personal life
Diamond is married to Marie Cohen, granddaughter of Polish politician Edward Werner. They have twin sons, born in 1987.

Boards
 Editorial board of the Skeptic Magazine, a publication of The Skeptics Society
 Member of the American Academy of Arts and Sciences
 Member of the National Academy of Sciences
 Member of the American Philosophical Society
 U.S. regional director of the World Wide Fund for Nature

Awards and honors

 1992 Tanner Lecturer, University of Utah
 1992 Rhône-Poulenc Prize for Science Books for The Third Chimpanzee
 1997 Phi Beta Kappa Science Book Prize for Guns, Germs and Steel
 1998 Pulitzer Prize for General Non-Fiction for Guns, Germs and Steel
 1998 California Book Awards, Gold Medal in nonfiction for Guns, Germs and Steel
 1998 Aventis Prize for Science Books for Guns, Germs and Steel
 1998 International Cosmos Prize
 1999 Lannan Literary Award for Nonfiction
 1999 National Medal of Science
 2001 Tyler Prize for Environmental Achievement
 2002 Lewis Thomas Prize for Writing about Science
 2004 A foreign holder of honorary title of Academician in Academy of Finland
 2005 Elected Honorary Fellow, Trinity College, Cambridge, England
 2006 Royal Society Prize for Science Books for Collapse (shortlisted)
 2006 Dickson Prize in Science
 2008 PhD Honoris Causa at the Katholieke Universiteit Leuven, Belgium
 2013 Wolf Prize in Agriculture 
 2016 American Humanist Association Humanist of the Year

Eastern long-beaked echidna Zaglossus bartoni diamondi was named in honor of Jared Diamond, as was the frog Austrochaperina adamantina.

Selected bibliography

 1992: The Third Chimpanzee: The Evolution and Future of the Human Animal (-)
 1997: Why Is Sex Fun? (-)
 1997: Guns, Germs, and Steel: The Fates of Human Societies. Also published with the title Guns, germs and steel: A short history of everybody for the last 13,000 years
 2005: Collapse: How Societies Choose to Fail or Succeed
 2010: Natural Experiments of History, with James A. Robinson
 2012: The World Until Yesterday: What Can We Learn from Traditional Societies?
 2015: The Third Chimpanzee for Young People: The Evolution and Future of the Human Animal
 2019: Upheaval: How Nations Cope with Crisis and Change

See also
 Assembly rules
 Comparative history
 Environmental determinism
 List of important publications in anthropology

References

External links

 Personal website
 Diamond's page at the UCLA Department of Geography
 UCLA Spotlight – Jared Diamond
 Jared Diamond  with bio, conversations, podcasts at The Third Culture,  (Edge Foundation)
 
 Jared Diamond: Why do societies collapse? (TED2003)
 Jared Diamond: How societies can grow old better (TED2013)

 Collapse: How Societies Choose to Fail or Succeed at The Earth Institute at Columbia University, April 2007
  at the Center for Religion and Civic Culture, University of Southern California
 PBS – Guns, Germs and Steel at PBS (with full transcripts)
 What can we learn from traditional societies?  at Royal Institution, October 2013
Hammer Conversation with Jared Diamond and John Long, Hammer Museum, March 16, 2010
 Interview with Jared Diamond and James A. Robinson about Natural Experiments of History at New Books in History
 
 Conversation With Jared Diamond: To Solve a Crisis, We Have to Acknowledge It First

1937 births
20th-century American biologists
20th-century American non-fiction writers
21st-century American biologists
21st-century American non-fiction writers
21st-century American writers
Alumni of Trinity College, Cambridge
American biophysicists
American geographers
American people of Moldovan-Jewish descent
American physiologists
American science writers
American skeptics
Evolutionary biologists
Harvard College alumni
Harvard Fellows
Human evolution theorists
Jewish biophysicists
Jewish American writers
Jewish American social scientists
Living people
MacArthur Fellows
Members of the United States National Academy of Sciences
National Medal of Science laureates
American non-fiction environmental writers
Pulitzer Prize for General Non-Fiction winners
Roxbury Latin School alumni
Theorists on Western civilization
University of California, Los Angeles faculty
Wolf Prize in Agriculture laureates
Writers from Boston
Writers from California
21st-century American Jews
Members of the American Philosophical Society
Members of the National Academy of Medicine
Discover (magazine) people